Auchmophoba is a genus of moths of the family Crambidae.

Species
Auchmophoba alternata (Warren, 1895)
Auchmophoba costastrigalis (Hampson, 1896)

Former species
Auchmophoba tynnuta Turner, 1913
Auchmophoba sufetuloides Hampson, 1919

References

Spilomelinae
Crambidae genera
Taxa named by Alfred Jefferis Turner